"Turn the Lights Off" is a single by Danish disc jockey and music producer Kato, from his debut album Discolized. It was released in Denmark as a digital download on 1 January 2010. The song peaked at number 4 on the Danish Singles Chart. The song features vocals from Danish singer Jon Nørgaard

Track listing
Digital download
 "Turn the Lights Off" (Radio Edit) - 2:58
 "Turn the Lights Off" (Extended Version) - 5:02

Chart performance

Weekly charts

Year-end charts

Certifications

Release history

References

2010 singles
Jon Nørgaard songs
2009 songs